Two ships of the Royal Navy have been named HMS Rother:

  was a  launched in 1904 and sold for scrap in 1919
  was a  launched in 1941 and scrapped in 1955

Royal Navy ship names